Trying to Burn the Sun is the third and final studio album released by American rock group Elf, released in 1975.

Track listing

Personnel

Elf 
 Ronnie James Dio - lead vocals
 Steve Edwards - lead guitar
 Mickey Lee Soule - keyboards, rhythm guitar
 Craig Gruber - bass guitar
 Gary Driscoll - drums
 Mark Nauseef - percussion

Additional musicians 
 Helen Chappelle, Barry St. John, Liza Strike - backing vocals
 Mountain Fjord Orchestra - strings

References 

Elf (band) albums
1975 albums
MGM Records albums